Abdi-Heba (Abdi-Kheba, Abdi-Hepat, or Abdi-Hebat) was a local chieftain of Jerusalem during the Amarna period (mid-1330s BC). Abdi-Heba's name can be translated as "servant of Hebat", a Hurrian goddess. Whether Abdi-Heba was himself of Hurrian descent is unknown, as is the relationship between the general populace of pre-Israelite Jerusalem (called Jebusites in the Bible) and the Hurrians. Egyptian documents have him deny he was a mayor (ḫazānu) and assert he is a soldier (we'w), the implication being he was the son of a local chief sent to Egypt to receive military training there.

Also unknown is whether he was part of a dynasty that governed Jerusalem or whether he was put on the throne by the Egyptians. Abdi-Heba himself notes that he holds his position not through his parental lineage but by the grace of Pharaoh, but this might be flattery rather than an accurate representation of the situation. At this time the area he administered from his garrison may have had a population of fifteen hundred people and Jerusalem would have been a 'small highlands stronghold' in the fourteenth century BC with no fortifications or large buildings.

Correspondence with Egypt
During Abdi-Heba's reign the region was under attack from marauding bands of Habiru. Abdi-Heba made frequent pleas to the Pharaoh of Egypt (probably Amenhotep III), for an army or, at least, an officer to command. Abdi-Heba also made other requests for military aid in fighting off his enemies, both Canaanite warlords and bands of Apiru:

As a result, conspiracy charges are made against Abdi-Heba, who defended himself strenuously in his correspondence with Pharaoh.

In later years Abdi-Heba appears to have reconciled with the Apiru, or at least certain bands of them, and hired mercenaries from among their ranks. Indeed, though he earlier complained about the depredations of Labaya, Shuwardata, king of the Canaanite town of Keilah as well as other places in the Judean highlands, refers to him as a "new Labaya":

Abdi-Heba's ultimate fate is unknown.

List of Abdi-Heba's 6 letters to Pharaoh
Abdi-Heba was the author of letters EA 285–290.
EA 285—title: "The soldier-ruler of Jerusalem"
EA 286—title: "A throne granted, not inherited"
EA 287—title: "A very serious crime"
EA 288—title: "Benign neglect"
EA 289—title: "A reckoning demanded"
EA 290—title: "Three against one"

Notes

References

Resources

Sources
Translations adapted from
Moran, William (ed. and trans.) The Amarna Letters. Baltimore: Johns Hopkins Univ. Press, 1992.

Other works
Baikie, James. The Amarna Age: A Study of the Crisis of the Ancient World. University Press of the Pacific, 2004.
Cohen, Raymond and Raymond Westbrook (eds.). Amarna Diplomacy: The Beginnings of International Relations. Johns Hopkins University Press, 2002.

Amarna letters writers
Ancient history of Jerusalem
Canaanite people
14th-century BC rulers
Jebusites
14th-century BC Near Eastern people